Wimbolds Trafford is a former civil parish, now in the parish of Mickle Trafford and District, in Cheshire West and Chester, England. It contains five buildings that are recorded in the National Heritage List for England as designated listed buildings.  Of these, one is listed at Grade II*, the middle grade, and the others are at Grade II. The parish is entirely rural.  Its listed buildings consist of a former country house and its lodge, a cottage, a farmhouse, and farm buildings.

Key

Buildings

References

Citations

Sources

Listed buildings in Cheshire West and Chester
Lists of listed buildings in Cheshire